Coleophora granulosella is a moth of the family Coleophoridae. It is found on Cyprus and in Asia Minor.

References

granulosella
Moths described in 1880
Moths of Europe
Moths of Asia